Nitzan Damari (born 13 January 1987) is a former Israeli footballer.

External links

1987 births
Living people
Israeli Jews
Israeli footballers
Association football defenders
Maccabi Petah Tikva F.C. players
Maccabi Herzliya F.C. players
Israeli Premier League players
Liga Leumit players
Israeli people of Yemeni-Jewish descent
Footballers from Rishon LeZion
Israel under-21 international footballers